Utleyville (original zip Code 81086) is an unincorporated community in Baca County, Colorado, United States.  It is approximately 32 driving miles west-southwest of Springfield, Colorado, the county seat. The U.S. Post Office at Pritchett (ZIP Code 81064) now serves Utleyville postal addresses.

Geography 
Utleyville is located at  (37.273643,-103.032017).

The town is just south of US Route 160.

History
The population of Utleyville was 11 in 1940.

References 

Unincorporated communities in Baca County, Colorado
Unincorporated communities in Colorado